Piet van Zyl (born 14 May 1979) is a Namibian rugby union player who captained the Boland Cavaliers in South Africa at provincial level, and played for the  at international level. Van Zyl was in the Namibian squad for the 2007 World Cup, and scored a try in his nation's first match in the competition, in a game against . Van Zyl plays as a centre. Van Zyl made his debut in August 2007 in a friendly match against .

References

1979 births
Living people
Rugby union centres
People from Worcester, South Africa
White Namibian people
Namibian Afrikaner people
Namibian rugby union players
Namibian expatriate rugby union players
Expatriate rugby union players in South Africa
Expatriate rugby union players in France
Namibian expatriate sportspeople in South Africa
Namibian expatriate sportspeople in France
Namibian people of South African descent
Namibian people of Dutch descent
Namibia international rugby union players